Idiotsitter is an American sitcom that premiered in the form of a web series on Comedy Central's CC: Studios on February 26, 2014, before being picked up for a run on television that premiered on Comedy Central on January 14, 2016. The series was created by Jillian Bell and Charlotte Newhouse, who star as Gene Russell (Bell) and Billie Brown (Newhouse), the series leads.

On June 13, 2016, Idiotsitter was initially renewed for a ten-episode second season, featuring Gene and Billie at a college campus, before being reduced to seven episodes, airing in a two-part marathon on June 10 and 17, 2017 on Comedy Central.

Synopsis
Idiotsitter follows Billie, a young strapped-for-cash woman who, in order to make some quick money, takes a job working as a nanny for a rich family in Los Angeles. She discovers that the position was a cover-up for the real job of supervisor and teacher to a full-grown woman-child named Gene, who is under house arrest.

Development and production
In November 2013, Idiotsitter was announced as a part of a development slate through Comedy Central's digital production studio, CC: Studios. The web series ran for six episodes in early 2014 before being picked up to series on Comedy Central in June 2014. Season one debuted on January 14, 2016. Jennifer Elise Cox replaced Angela Little in the role of Tanzy Russell for the TV series.

Cast
 Jillian Bell as Genevieve "Gene" Russell
 Charlotte Newhouse as Wilhelmina "Billie" Brown
 Stephen Root as Kent Russell (season 1, recurring season 2)
 Elizabeth De Razzo as Joy (season 1)
 Jennifer Elise Cox as Tanzy Russell (season 1)

Recurring
 Steve Berg as Chet/Bret
 Ryan Gaul as McCallister Dobbs

Episodes

Web series (2014)

Season 1 (2016)

Season 2 (2017)

Critical response
Idiotsitter has been met with favorable reviews from critics. On Metacritic, it holds a rating of 68/100 based on six reviews. On Rotten Tomatoes, it holds an 88% approval rating, based on eight reviews with an average rating of 7.2/10.

References

External links
 
 

2016 American television series debuts
2017 American television series endings
2010s American sitcoms
Comedy Central original programming
English-language television shows
Television series by 3 Arts Entertainment
Television shows set in Los Angeles
Television series about educators